Our Most Dangerous Stunts is an album of re-recorded songs by The Ozark Mountain Daredevils recorded in 1996 and originally released as Jackie Blue in the U.S. in March 1997.

Track listing

"Chicken Train"
"Jackie Blue"
"Fly Away Home"
"It'll Shine When It Shines"
"If You Wanna Get To Heaven"
"Black Sky"
"Homemade Wine"
"Walkin' Down The Road"
"You Made It Right"
"Country Girl"

Personnel
Steve Cash - harmonica, harpsichord, percussion, vocals
John Dillon - guitar, mandolin, fiddle, dulcimer, autoharp, keyboards, percussion, vocals
Larry Lee - backing vocals
Michael Granda - bass, percussion, vocals
Steve Canaday - backing vocals

The Ozark Mountain Daredevils albums
2006 albums